The 2015 Big Ten men's basketball tournament was held from March 11 through March 15 at United Center in Chicago, Illinois. This was the eighteenth annual Big Ten tournament and was the first tournament to feature 14 teams of the expanded Big Ten to include Maryland and Rutgers. The championship was won by Wisconsin who defeated Michigan State in the championship game. As a result, Wisconsin received the Big Ten's automatic bid to the NCAA tournament. The win marked Wisconsin's third tournament championship and first since 2008.

Seeds

All 14 Big Ten schools participated in the tournament. Teams were seeded by conference record, with a tiebreaker system used to seed teams with identical conference records. Seeding for the tournament was determined at the close of the regular conference season. The top 10 teams received a first round bye and the top four teams received a double bye. Tiebreaking procedures were unchanged from the 2014 tournament.

Game summaries

First round

Second round

Quarterfinals

Semifinals

Championship

Bracket

All-Tournament Team
Frank Kaminsky, Wisconsin – Big Ten tournament Most Outstanding Player
Branden Dawson, Michigan State
Travis Trice, Michigan State
D. J. Newbill, Penn State
Nigel Hayes, Wisconsin

See also
2015 Big Ten Conference women's basketball tournament

References

External links
Tournament results at BigTen.org

Big Ten men's basketball tournament
Tournament
Big Ten Conference men's basketball tournament
Big Ten men's basketball tournament